Chicago Training School can refer to:
Chicago Manual Training School
Chicago Training School for Home and Foreign Missions
Chicago Training School for Home and Public Nursing